Slavče is a municipality and village in České Budějovice District in the South Bohemian Region of the Czech Republic. It has about 700 inhabitants.

Administrative parts
Villages of Dobrkovská Lhotka, Keblany, Lniště, Mohuřice and Záluží are administrative parts of Slavče.

References

Villages in České Budějovice District